Presumed Innocent is an upcoming legal thriller miniseries based on the novel of the same name by Scott Turow.

Premise
A prosecutor becomes the prime suspect in the murder of one of his colleagues.

Cast
 Jake Gyllenhaal as Rusty Sabich
 Ruth Negga as Barbara Sabich
 Bill Camp as Raymond Horgan
 Elizabeth Marvel as Lorraine Horgan
 Renate Reinsve as Carolyn Polhemus
 Peter Sarsgaard as Tommy Molto
 O-T Fagbenle as Nico Della Guardia
 Chase Infiniti as Jaden Sabich
 Lily Rabe as Dr. Liz Rush
 Nana Mensah as Det. Alana Rodriguez
 Matthew Alan as Dalton Caldwell
 Kingston Rumi Southwick

Production
It was announced in February 2022 that Apple TV+ had ordered an eight episode miniseries adaptation of the Scott Turow novel, with David E. Kelley writing the series. In December, Jake Gyllenhaal entered negotiations to star in and executive produce the series. He would be confirmed by January 2023, with Ruth Negga, Bill Camp and Elizabeth Marvel joining the cast. Greg Yaitanes and Anne Sewitsky were hired to direct the series. In February, additional casting including Renate Reinsve, Peter Sarsgaard, O-T Fagbenle, Lily Rabe and Nana Mensah were added to the cast.

Filming began in February 2023 in Pasadena, California.

References

External links 
Presumed Innocent at the Internet Movie Database

Apple TV+ original programming
Upcoming television series
American legal drama television series
American thriller television series